Yurkovo is a rural locality (a selo) in Bolshesosnovskoye Rural Settlement, Bolshesosnovsky District, Perm Krai, Russia. The population was 416 as of 2010. There are 7 streets.

Geography 
Yurkovo is located 10 km north of Bolshaya Sosnova (the district's administrative centre) by road. Verkh-Sosnova is the nearest rural locality.

References 

Rural localities in Bolshesosnovsky District